The Smith School of Enterprise and the Environment (also known as the Smith School) is an interdisciplinary hub of the University of Oxford directed by Professor Cameron Hepburn that focuses upon teaching, research, and engagement with businesses and enterprise and long-term environmental sustainability.

The Smith School was founded through a benefaction from the Smith Family Educational Foundation and officially opened in 2008. From 2008 to 2012 Professor Sir David King served as the founding director of the Smith School followed by Professor Gordon Clark from January 2013 to October 2018.

The Smith School is part of the School of Geography and the Environment.

References

Departments of the University of Oxford